Brian Wicks (born 10 April 1940) is  a former Australian rules footballer who played with Fitzroy and North Melbourne in the Victorian Football League (VFL).

Notes

External links 
		

Living people
1940 births
Australian rules footballers from Victoria (Australia)
Fitzroy Football Club players
North Melbourne Football Club players